Mandy Haase (born 25 June 1982, in Leipzig) is a field hockey defender from Germany, who won the gold medal with the National Women's Team at the 2004 Summer Olympics in Athens, Greece. She made her debut for the national squad on 18 May 2003 in a friendly match against the Czech Republic (3-0).

International senior tournaments
 2003 – European Nations Cup, Barcelona (third place)
 2004 – Olympic qualifier, Auckland (fourth place)
 2004 – Summer Olympics, Athens (first place)
 2005 – European Nations Cup, Dublin (second place)
 2005 – Champions Trophy, Canberra (fifth place)
 2006 – Champions Trophy, Amstelveen (first place)
 2006 – World Cup, Madrid (eighth place)
 2007 – European Nations Cup, Manchester (first place)
 2008 – Champions Trophy, Mönchengladbach (second place)
 2008 – Summer Olympics, Beijing (fourth place)
 2012 – Summer Olympics, London (seventh place)

References
 Profile on Hockey Olympica

External links
 

1982 births
Living people
German female field hockey players
Olympic field hockey players of Germany
Field hockey players at the 2004 Summer Olympics
Field hockey players at the 2008 Summer Olympics
Olympic gold medalists for Germany
Sportspeople from Leipzig
Olympic medalists in field hockey
Field hockey players at the 2012 Summer Olympics
Medalists at the 2004 Summer Olympics
21st-century German women